Mahshid Mirmoezzi is an Iranian translator from the German language. She has translated over 40 works into the Persian language. She has received several prizes, including the Parvin Award for her translation of Pascal Mercier's Night Train to Lisbon.

Biography
Mahshid Mirmoezzi was born in Qazvin, Iran in 1962. She attended the University of Essen, Germany from 1985, obtaining a degree in environmental engineering. She returned to Iran in 1993.

Mirmoezzi worked as a freelance journalist for various publications, including Hamshahri Monthly, Golagha and Rudaki.

Her career as a translator began with Ruth Berlau's Brechts Lai-Tu in 1998. In 2002, her translation of Irvin D. Yalom's When Nietzsche Wept was published.

In 2013, she published her translation of Pascal Mercier's Night Train to Lisbon, for which she won the Parvin Award. Iran does not recognize various international copyright accords, but Mirmoezzi received permission from the author before she translated it.

2016 saw the release of two works: Martin Suter's Lila, Lila as well as Iris Radisch's Camus: The Ideal of Simplicity.

As of 2017, Mirmoezzi has published over 40 translations.

Selected translations

References

External links
 Mahshid Mirmoezzi's page

Translators from German
Iranian translators
People from Qazvin
1962 births
Living people